Gloria transita is a 1917 Dutch silent film directed by Johan Gildemeijer.

Cast
 August Van den Hoeck - Ben Solotti
 Henny Schroeder - Henny
 Frederick Vogeding - Gaston
 Eberhard Erfmann - Baron Villers
 Nelly De Heer - Baron Viller's mother
 Jacques Cauveren - Operazanger
 Jan Feith - Lid van de Muzikale Club
 Piet Fuchs - Misdadige vader van Henny
 Johan Gildemeijer - Tennisspeler
 Irma Lozin - Operazangeres
 Wilhelmina van den Hoeck - Operazangeres
 Jan van der Horst
 Ernst Winar

External links 
 

1917 films
Dutch silent feature films
Dutch black-and-white films